Ivan Veselinov (16 November 1926 – 1996) was a Bulgarian weightlifter. He competed at the 1956 Summer Olympics, the 1960 Summer Olympics and the 1964 Summer Olympics.

References

1926 births
1996 deaths
Bulgarian male weightlifters
Olympic weightlifters of Bulgaria
Weightlifters at the 1956 Summer Olympics
Weightlifters at the 1960 Summer Olympics
Weightlifters at the 1964 Summer Olympics
Place of birth missing
World Weightlifting Championships medalists
20th-century Bulgarian people